Long Datih is a Christian Kelabit longhouse settlement in the mountainous interior of Sarawak, Malaysia.

The village converted to Christianity in the 1940s; a visitor in 1960 described how, as well as Sunday services in the village chapel, prayers were held in each longhouse at the start of each day.

Neighbouring settlements include:

References

Villages in Sarawak